is a town located in Kunigami District, Okinawa Prefecture, Japan. As of October 2016, the town has an estimated population of 13,441 and a density of 250 persons per km2.

Several islands can be accessed from Motobu, namely the small islands of Sesoko (by bridge) and Minna-jima (by ferry). Both islands are incorporated as part of the Town of Motobu. Ferry service also runs from Motobu Port to Ie-jima.
Motobu is served by three large supermarkets and eight individual schools from elementary to high school levels.

Like many towns in Okinawa, Motobu is composed of what were formerly several smaller and independent villages. In addition to Motobu proper other included districts are Sesoko, Kamimotobu, Sakimotobu and Izumi.

The well-known Okinawa Churaumi Aquarium is located in Motobu. Other notable sites include the remains of Nakijin Castle, as well as several cafes.

Geography

The town of Motobu sits on the northern part of Okinawa Island. The town occupies the eastern part of the Motobu Peninsula as well as two islands: Minnajima and Sesokojima. Motobu is bordered by Nago to the south, Nakijin to the east, and by the East China Sea to the west.

The Minna River runs from the center of the Motobu Peninsula through the town and empties into the East China Sea at the small Toguchi Bay. Coral around the entrance of the bay was removed to create a natural shipping channel into the bay, and the town center is concentrated in this area.

There are beaches with white sand and clear water such as Minnajima Beach.

Parks

The Omoro Botanical Garden and Tropical & Subtropical Arboretum are located in the northern portion of this town.

History

Motobu magiri covered the area of the present-day town. The magiri, a type of regional administrative district, were abolished under Imperial Edict 46 in 1907, and the Town of Motobu was incorporated in 1908.

Ocean Expo 1975 

In 1975, the World Exposition was held in Motobu, with a focus on the world's oceans. After the expo concluded, Ocean Expo Park was built on the site. Ocean Expo Park is the site of the Okinawa Churaumi Aquarium as well as other exhibits highlighting the Okinawa Island and its culture.

Okinawa Churaumi Aquarium

The Okinawa Churaumi Aquarium is located within the Ocean Expo Commemorative National Government Park. The aquarium consists of four floors, with tanks containing deep sea creatures, sharks, coral and tropical fish. The aquarium was the world's largest until the construction of the Georgia Aquarium in the city of Atlanta, Georgia. The aquarium additionally holds 80 species of coral. The Okinawa Churaumi Aquarium is one of only a few aquariums that keeps and attempts to breed whale sharks in captivity.

Education
Motobu High School, a public high school operated by the Okinawa Prefectural Board of Education, serves the area.
 Located on Sesoko Island is another high school for the severely disabled

Motobu's public elementary and junior high schools are run under the guidance of the Motobu Board of Education located in Ohama Town, central Motobu. The Board also serves as a meeting place, art exhibit, English class, and a venue for other various town events.

Public elementary and junior high schools are:
 Motobu Junior High School (本部中学校), located in Ohama Town, central Motobu
 Motobu Elementary School (本部小学校), located in Ohama Town, central Motobu
 Kamimotobu Gakuen (上本部学園) - Kamimotobu Junior High School (上本部中学校) and Kamimotobu Elementary School (上本部小学校) - located in Yamagawa Town near the Churaumi Aquarium
 Minna Elementary and Junior High School (水納小中学校) - On Minna-Jimma serving the residing 5 students of the island, in view of Toguchi port. 25 minute ferry
 Sesoko Elementary School (瀬底小学校) - located on Sesoko Island
 Izumi Elementary and Junior High School (伊豆味小中学校) - located near Nakijin Town

Former schools:
 Sakimotobu Elementary School (崎本部小学校), located on the outskirts of Ohama Town
 Sesoko Elementary School was formerly Sesoko Elementary and Junior High School (瀬底小中学校)

Private schools:
 Yashima Gakuen University International High School, a private school, is located in Motobu.

Transportation

Motobu is located between the towns of Nakajin and Nago and can be reached by either route 449 or 84.

Port
There are plans to expand the pier in Motobu, and deepen the port. As ships of only up to 20,000 tons can dock at the port, only two cruise ships visited in 2014 and one in 2015. The expansion of the pier would allow larger cruise ships, especially carrying Chinese tourists, to dock. Berths at Naha port are limited and docking requests have been rejected for this reason.

References

Towns in Okinawa Prefecture